The 1992–93 Segunda División season saw 20 teams participate in the second flight Spanish league. UE Lleida, Real Valladolid and Racing de Santander were promoted to Primera División. UE Figueres, CD Lugo, Sestao and CE Sabadell FC were relegated to Segunda División B.

Teams

Final table

Results

Promotion playoff

First Leg

Second Leg 

Segunda División seasons
2
Spain